This article gives an overview of Liberalism in South Korea. It is limited to liberal parties with substantial support, mainly proven by having had a representation in parliament.

Historically, the liberal movement in the South Korean began as a 'moderate right-wing' movement against far-right dictatorship, but in the current political structure of the South Korea in the 2020s, it has become a 'moderate left-wing' against the right-wing conservative movement. The Democratic Party of Korea is a "centrist-liberal" party and is considered "centre-left" party, also, the Justice Party is considered a "centre-left" or "leftist-liberal" party.

There are various political positions within South Korean liberals, but they tend to be mostly common in diplomacy: promoting harmony with North Korea, justice against Japan, and, wherever possible, autonomy from great power interference, including that of Washington. South Korean liberalism is also based on a moderate nationalist tradition based on the Korean independence movement against China and Japan. South Korean liberals support the Sunshine Policy toward North Korea.

Introduction

The word "liberal" in South Korea is often used in its traditional sense. In South Korea, conservatives also call themselves "liberal" and "liberal democracy" in a similar sense to economic liberalism and anti-communism. "Liberals" in the general sense often refer to themselves as "Democrats", "Ribeoreol" (the Korean pronunciation of the English "liberal") or "Democratic Camps". In South Korea, "liberal" and "progressive" are political forces with individual traditions, but when translating "liberal" in the United States into Korean language, it is often translated into "progressive". The Justice Party officially supports social democracy, but since it is a party that inherited the political stake of the Uri Party, it is regarded as part of the South Korean progressive political party tradition and at the same time as part of the liberal political party tradition.

In South Korea, the terms "liberal," "liberty," "libertarian," and "freedom" all tend to be translated into Jayu. For example, in South Korea, both Canada's "Liberal Party", Netherlands' "Party for Freedom" and the United States' "Libertarian Party" are read as Jayudang in Korean. Also, right-wing socially conservative media in South Korea regard the American tradition of right-libertarianism as progressive because it is culturally liberal.

The main diplomatic point that defines liberalism in South Korea is "independence" (독립). Modern South Korean liberals are relatively more friendly to immigration and multiculturalism than conservatives. However, South Korean liberals have a more nationalistic nature based on anti-imperialism in matters related to neighboring powers such as the China and Japan. The anti-China Gaehwa Party / Independence Club at the end of the 19th century, and the anti-Japan Korean independence movement during the Japanese colonial era, formed Korea's early liberalism. On the other hand, Korea's conservative elites cooperated with neighboring powers such as China and Japan for practical reasons. In Modern South Korean politics, where socialism and anti-Americanism were thoroughly suppressed, conservatives who conform to the powers and liberals who have resisted Chinese/Japanese imperialism may differ in degree, but paradoxically, both camps have resulted in pro-American tendencies. To this day, South Korean liberals haven't forgiven conservative elites who cooperated with Chinese/Japanese imperialism. South Korean liberals were proud of the history of resisting Park Chung-hee's right-wing dictatorship, who served as an officer during the Japanese Empire.

South Korean liberals have a contradictory standard on international human rights violations. South Korean liberals are less critical of North Korea than conservatives and oppose the 'North Korean Human Rights Law' (북한인권법). However, South Korean liberals are more strongly opposed than conservatives to human rights violations in other authoritarian states (e.g., China, Myanmar, etc.) except North Korea. The liberal Kyunghyang Shinmun criticized Yoon Suk-yeol for ignoring the human rights issue of Xinjiang, considering only its economic interests with China. In 2021, Moon Jae-in government opposed Myanmar's military dictatorship and supported strong sanctions against Myanmar's military, but Moon Jae-in government deliberately ignored North Korea's human rights violations. (This is related to the resistance-nationalist sentiment of South Korean liberals.)

South Korean major liberals mainly criticize mainstream conservatives, clear their heritage during military dictatorship, insist on political reform, supports the foreign policy of reconciliation with North Korea. They are distinguished from progressives and cultural liberals. Therefore, South Korean some liberals tend to be socially conservative in LGBT rights, Disability rights, abortion and minority rights issues. (The socially conservative tendency of South Korean liberals is not traditional conservatism based on Confucianism, but is more influenced by Christianity, which is part of Western culture.) They also tend to distance themselves from the (Including social democracy) "socialism" or fundamental "left-wing".

On the domestic front, they advocated the breaking-up of the monopoly of the large industrial conglomerates known as chaebols. They also proposed the redelegation of investigative powers of the prosecutor's office over to the police, as they viewed them as powerful political tools.

History 
During the colonial period, Marxist historian Paek Nam-un evaluated Silhak as "pioneer of early modern period liberalism," while Ahn Jae-hong, a liberal nationalist, evaluated Silhak and Silhak scholar Jeong Yak-yong as "the origin of late modern period liberalism by presenting elimination of (feudal) class and support for equality". Silhak criticized the existing Confucian conservatism and Sadaejuui, aiming for political reform and pragmatism, and also argued for the superiority of Western science and technology. Some Silhak scholar also believed in Christianity.

Korea's first classical liberal and Enlightenmentists party was the Gaehwa Party, which appeared in 1874. They aimed for radical political and social reform, cut off unequal relations with the powerful Qing Dynasty and tried to create a completely independent Joseon Dynasty, and led by Seo Jae-pil in 1896 was a practical successor to the Gaehwa Party. Influenced by Japanese liberalism, they showed pro-Japanese tendencies, but at the same time insisted on independent and independent Korea. In the 1900s, classical liberals and Enlightenmentists in Korea were largely divided into two groups. Some became Chinilpa who cooperated with Japan, and others who devoted themselves to the Korean independence movement.

During the colonial era, Korean liberalism is closely related to the Korean independence movement. South Korean historians say that the March 1st Movement, which took place in 1919, affected democracy and liberalism in South Korea as a movement involving many Koreans regardless of gender, religion, or occupation. The Republic of Korean Provisional Government, established thanks to the value of the March 1st Movement, has established a modern national system in name and reality by introducing the separation of powers of government, parliament, and judiciary based on freedom and equality, and common elections including women. (However, since it was located in Shanghai, China, it was more of a Korean independence movement organization than a korean government.)

After the end of Japanese colonial rule, with the inauguration of the Republic of Korea government, the word "liberal" has been used in South Korea for a while in a similar sense to anti-communism and anti-socialism. That is why not only ideological liberals but also hard-line conservatives and far-right anti-communists called themselves "liberal." A case in point was the "Liberal Party", a South Korean far-right national-conservative party influenced by Shōwa Statism, German and Italian fascism. In particular, Syngman Rhee, the first president of the Liberal Party, committed authoritarian rule and election fraud based on Ilminism, an anti-liberal individual worship ideology from 1948 to 1960, and liberals and students who opposed it caused April Revolution. This was the first successful liberal revolution in South Korea.

Due to the April Revolution (1960), Syngman Rhee stepped down from his presidency, the first liberal democratic government in South Korea was established, and the presidential system was converted to a parliamentary cabinet system. However, South Korean liberal democracy collapses in less than a year in a 1961 military coup caused by Major Park Chung-hee. Since then, South Korea has suffered from more than 20 years of military dictatorship. Until South Korea was fully democratized in 1988, there have been several democratization movements, including Bu-Ma Democratic Protests and Gwangju Uprising.

South Korea was democratized in 1987, but it was in 1998 that liberals changed their regime. Since the Kim Dae-jung administration in 1998, South Korean liberals are actively supporting the Sunshine Policy, to promote peace and reconciliation through economic aid and co-operation, or “South-North economic co-operation” (남북경협).

Liberal parties
The political party that once were ruling party are in bold.

Minjudangkye tradition
In South Korea, South Korean's unique liberal and korean nationalist parties are often referred to as Minjudangkye parties. In South Korea, usually "liberal" political parties mean "Minjudangkye" parties.

Mainstream parties
 Christian Social Democratic Party → Korea Democratic Party (1945–1949)
 Democratic Nationalist Party (1949–1955)
 Democratic Party (1955–1961; Governing period: 1960–1961)
 New Democratic Party → Civil Rights Party → Civilian's Party (1960–1967; Governing period: 1961–1962)
 New Democratic Party (1967–1980)
 Democratic Korea Party (1981–1988)
 New Korean Democratic Party → Reunification Democratic Party (1985–1990)
 New Korean Democratic Party (1984–1988)
 Peace Democratic Party → New Democratic Unionist Party (1987–1991)
 Reunification Democratic Party (1987–1990)
 Democratic Party (1991–1995)
 Democratic Party → National Congress for New Politics (1995–2000; Governing period: 1998–2000)
 Millennium Democratic Party → Democratic Party (2000–2008; Governing period: 2000–2003)
 Uri Party (2002–2007; Governing period: 2004–2007)
 Grand Unified Democratic New Party (2007–2008; Governing period: 2007-2008)
 United Democratic Party → Democratic Party (2008–2011)
 Democratic United Party → Democratic Party (2011–2014)
 New Politics Alliance for Democracy → Minjoo Party → Democratic Party (since 2014; Governing period: since 2017)
 Platform Party (satellite party for the 2020 election)
 People's Party (2016–2018, splinter party)
 Bareunmirae Party (2018–2020, splinter party)
 Minsaeng Party (since 2020, splinter party)

Minor parties
 Democratic Party (1963–1965)
 Liberal Democratic Party (1963–1965)
 National Party (1971)
 Democratic Unification Party (1973–1980)
 Civil Rights Party (1981–1985)
 New Democratic Party (1985)
 Democratic Party (1990–1991)
 Democratic Party (1995–1997)
 Democratic Party (2007–2008)
 The Participation Party (2010–2011)
 Peace Democratic Party → People's Happiness Party (2010–2012)
 Real Democratic Party (2012)
 New Political Vision Party (2014)
 Minjoo Party (2014–2016)
 Party for Democracy and Peace (2018–2020)
 New Alternatives (2020)
 Open Democratic Party (2020–2022)
 Future Democratic Party (2020)
 Platform Party (2020)
 Transition Korea (since 2020)
 Basic Income Party (since 2020)
 New Wave (2021–2022)

Non-Minjudangkye 
In South Korea, these political parties are not often referred to as general "liberal"  in Korean language, but in an international context, they are clearly referred to as "liberal" political parties.
 Progressive Party (1956–1958)
 Creative Korea Party (2007–2012)
 Unified Progressive Party (2011-2012)
 People Party (2016–2018)
 Korean Welfare Party (since 2016)
 Grand National Unity Party (2017–2018)
 Bareunmirae Party (2018–2020)
 Justice Party (since 2012)
 Dawn of Liberty Party (since 2019)
 Transition Korea (since 2020)
 Basic Income Party (since 2020)
 People Party (2020–2022)
 Minsaeng Party (since 2020)

Liberal media in South Korea
 Hankook Ilbo - centrist, classically liberal
 The Korea Times (English-language newspapers)
 Kyunghyang Shinmun - centre to centre-left, liberal
 The Hankyoreh - centre-left, socially liberal
 Cine21 (film magazine)
 OhmyNews - liberal-leaning, progressive liberal

Liberal organizations
In South Korea, 'political liberalism' and 'non-political liberalism' are distinguished. Therefore, the groups listed below may not be directly related to a particular political party or political power.

Civil rights organizations 
 ASUNARO: Action for Youth Rights of Korea - Student rights
 Chingusai - LGBT rights
 Solidarity Against Disability Discrimination - Disability rights
 Solidarity for LGBT Human Rights of Korea - LGBT rights

Labour organizations 
 Federation of Korean Trade Unions
 Korean Confederation of Trade Unions (factions) - There are also non-liberal/socialists within the KCTU.
 Korean Teachers and Education Workers Union (factions)

Libertarian organizations 
South Korean libertarians define themselves as Jayujuuija (자유주의자). But South Korean center-left liberals also define themselves as Jayujuuija, so it is important in what context the South Korean political term is used
 Center for Free Enterprise - libertarian/conservative

Nationalist (liberal-nationalist) organizations 
 Voluntary Agency Network of Korea

Other 
 Korea Democracy Foundation
 Minbyun

Liberal presidents in South Korea
 Yun Bo-seon (Democratic) (1960–1962)
 Kim Dae-jung (National Congress for New Politics→Millennium Democratic Party) (1998–2003)
 Roh Moo-hyun (Millennium Democratic Party→Uri Party→United New Democratic Party) (2003–2008)
 Moon Jae-in (Democratic) (2017–2022)

Major liberal parties election results of South Korea

Presidential elections

Legislative elections

Local elections

See also
386 Generation
Anti-sadaejuui
Classical liberalism
Conservatism in South Korea
Conservative liberalism (centre to centre-right)
Economic liberalism
Economic progressivism
History of South Korea
Liberalism in Japan - This influenced the formation of early Korean liberalism.
List of political parties in South Korea
Minjudang
Politics of South Korea
Progressivism in South Korea
Social conservatism
Social liberalism (centre-left)
Social democracy (centre-left to left-wing)
Sunshine policy
Undongkwon

Notes

References

 
Political history of South Korea
Korean nationalism
Anti-imperialism in Korea
Civic nationalism
Korean independence movement
 
Anti-sadaejuui